High Jack  is a 2018 Indian Hindi-language comedy stoner film directed by Akarsh Khurana, starring Sumeet Vyas, Mantra and Sonnalli Seygall. The film's theatrical trailer was launched on 27 March 2018. It was released on 18 May 2018. Upon release, the film received negative reviews & was a Disaster at the Box-Office.

Plot
An aspiring DJ is duped by a conman and he inadvertently acts as a drug mule. Hilarity ensues when the flight he is on gets hijacked by a group of well meaning employees of the airline, and every one unknowingly gets high on the drug.

Cast
Sumeet Vyas as Rakesh
Mantra Mugdh as Vinit
Sonnalli Seygall as Dilshaad
Kumud Mishra as Mr. Taneja
Priyanshu Painyuli as Chaitanya
Shiv Kumar Subramaniam
Amey Wagh
Boloram Das as iPad Man
 Taaruk Raina as Parth

Soundtrack

References

External links
 
 High Jack at Bollywood Hungama

2018 films
Indian comedy films
2010s Hindi-language films
Films directed by Akarsh Khurana